Chris Womersley (born 1968 in Melbourne, Victoria) is an Australian author of crime fiction, short stories and poetry.  He trained as a radio journalist and has travelled extensively to such places as India, South-East Asia, South America, North America, and West Africa.  He lives in Melbourne.

Awards 
 1998, The Australian Short Story Competition: commended for "Men and Women"
 2006, Victorian Premier's Literary Award, Prize for an Unpublished Manuscript by an Emerging Victorian Writer: shortlisted for The Low Road 
 2007, Josephine Ulrick Literature Prize: winner for "The Possibility of Water"
 2008, Ned Kelly Awards for Crime Writing, Best First Novel: winner for The Low Road
 2011, ALS Gold Medal: shortlisted for Bereft
 2011, Miles Franklin Award, shortlisted for Bereft

Bibliography

Novels
The Low Road (2007)
Bereft (2010)
 Cairo (novel) (2013)
City of Crows (2017)
The Diplomat (2022)

Short stories
A Lovely and Terrible Thing (2019)

References

External links
Author's website
Author's page at Scribe Publications
Miles Franklin website
Aust Crime Fiction Database: Chris Womersley
The Age newspaper website

Australian crime writers
Australian poets
1968 births
Living people
Australian male novelists
Ned Kelly Award winners